Lycée Camille Sée is a senior high school/sixth-form college in Colmar, Haut-Rhin, France.

The school includes a boarding facility.

References

External links
 Lycée Camille Sée 

Lycées in Haut-Rhin
Colmar